The 1999 Eastern Illinois Panthers football team represented Eastern Illinois University in the 1999 NCAA Division I-AA football season.

Schedule

References 

Eastern Illinois Panthers football seasons
Eastern Illinois
Eastern Illinois Panthers football